Verjamem (meaning "I believe" in Slovene) was a centre-left political party in Slovenia. The party is led by Igor Šoltes, former President of the  Court of Auditors.

At the 2014 European Parliament election, the party received 10.46% of the vote, winning one of Slovenia's eight seats in the parliament taken by party leader Igor Šoltes, who chose to sit with The Greens–European Free Alliance (Greens/EFA) group as an associated MEP.

The party received 0.78% of the vote in the Slovenian parliamentary election on 13 July 2014, and did not win any seats in parliament.

References

External links

2014 establishments in Slovenia
Political parties established in 2014
Social democratic parties in Slovenia